"The Phuncky Feel One" is the second single of rap group Cypress Hill's self-titled debut album. It was released in 1991 as a single and featured the previous single of the album, "How I Could Just Kill a Man" as a B-side. It's produced by the producer of Cypress Hill, DJ Muggs and is three minutes and twenty-eight seconds long. The song also topped the Hot Rap Singles's charts.

An extended version of this track appears on the UK CD single of "When the Shit Goes Down".

Track listing

Charts

References

Cypress Hill songs
1991 singles
1991 songs
Ruffhouse Records singles
Songs written by DJ Muggs
Songs written by B-Real
Songs written by Sen Dog
Song recordings produced by DJ Muggs